is a Japanese television jidaigeki or period drama that was broadcast in 1974. It is the 4th in the Hissatsu series. The drama is a sequel to Hissatsu Shiokinin.

Plot
Itoi Mitsugu was a scholar of Rangaku but after Bansha no goku happened, he lives as a Shamisen player. He and Daikichi join Nakamura Monodo's team and kill bad guys.

Cast
Koji Ishizaka as Itoi Mitsugu
Makoto Fujita as Nakamura Mondo
Yosuke Kondo as Daikichi
Yumiko Nogawaas Okin
Masaaki Tsusaka as Hanji
Mari Shiraki as Ritsu Nakamura
Kin Sugai as Sen Nakamura

See also
 Hissatsu Shikakenin (First in the Hissatsu series) 
 Hissatsu Shiokinin  (2nd in the Hissatsu series) 
 Shin Hissatsu Shiokinin (10th in the Hissatsu series)

References

1974 Japanese television series debuts
1970s drama television series
Jidaigeki television series